Isomura (written: 磯村) is a Japanese surname. Notable people with the surname include:

, Japanese actor
, Japanese film director
, Japanese footballer
, Japanese politician
, Japanese voice actress
Yoshiyuki Isomura (born 1955), Japanese golfer

Japanese-language surnames